John Yancey (born January 18, 1970) is a former professional tennis player from the United States.

Biography
As a junior Yancey partnered with Jonathan Stark to win the boys' doubles title at the 1988 US Open.

Recruited from Grosse Pointe, Yancey played collegiate tennis at the Kentucky Wildcats. He also had an opportunity to play basketball for the Wildcats but decided to dedicate all of his efforts to tennis.

In the early 1990s he played on the professional tour as a doubles specialist. Across 1993 and 1994 he appeared in the main draw of eight ATP Tour tournaments. His best result was a quarter-final appearance partnering Rich Benson at the San Marino Open in the 1993 season and the following year he reached his highest ranking of 142 in the world for doubles.

References

External links
 
 

1970 births
Living people
American male tennis players
Tennis people from Michigan
People from Grosse Pointe Woods, Michigan
Sportspeople from Detroit
Kentucky Wildcats men's tennis players
US Open (tennis) junior champions
Grand Slam (tennis) champions in boys' doubles